Kathryn Mary Draper Garraway  (born 4 May 1967) is an English broadcaster and journalist. In the 1990s, Garraway was a journalist for ITV News Central and later a co-presenter of ITV News Meridian. From 2000 to 2010, she co-presented GMTV. Currently, Garraway is the presenter of Mid Mornings with Kate Garraway on Smooth Radio and newsreader (on Thursdays) and co-anchor (on Fridays) of the ITV Breakfast programme Good Morning Britain.

Early life
Garraway's father was a civil servant and her mother was a teacher. She attended Dunmore Primary School and Fitzharrys School in Abingdon. She then graduated from Bath College of Higher Education (now Bath Spa University) with a degree in English and History.

Career

Television
In 1989, Garraway joined the South edition of ITV News Central on ITV Central as a production journalist, reporter and news presenter. In 1996, she became co-presenter of the South East edition of ITV News Meridian on ITV Meridian after she was "talent spotted" by a boss who viewed her presenting a three-minute bulletin on ITV Central.

In 1998, Garraway joined Sunrise on Sky News with Martin Stanford.

Garraway joined GMTV in September 2000, co-presenting GMTV Today with Andrew Castle each Friday (and Thursdays later on). Garraway eventually went on to share presenting duties with Fiona Phillips and  Emma Crosby. In 2009, when GMTV relaunched, she co-hosted the programme with Ben Shephard, presenting on Mondays, Tuesdays and alternate Wednesdays. During Garraway's time at GMTV, she had also co-presented with  Eamonn Holmes, John Stapleton and Dan Lobb. She presented her final show on 31 August 2010.

She presented one series of Too Many Cooks in 2004. In 2007, she was a questioner on The People's Quiz. In 2009, Garraway presented The Biggest Loser for ITV. She was later replaced by Davina McCall. Garraway was a regular panellist on Wall of Fame, hosted by David Walliams.

She became entertainment editor of Daybreak on ITV Breakfast (the successor to GMTV) in September 2010. On 6 December 2011, she took over from Christine Bleakley as the main presenter on an interim basis. On 4 May 2012, it was announced Lorraine Kelly would become the permanent replacement for Bleakley in September 2012. On 3 August 2012, it was reported that Garraway had signed a new contract to present each Friday in Kelly's absence. On 15 February 2014, it was announced Kelly would additionally front the Friday edition of Lorraine.

On 3 March 2014, it was reported that Daybreak would be cancelled and replaced with Good Morning Britain. However, with these changes came the news that Lorraine Kelly would be presenting Lorraine five days a week, meaning that Garraway no longer continued to present Kelly's show on Fridays. She hosted her final Daybreak and Lorraine shows on 25 April 2014 ahead of joining Good Morning Britain the following month. Since joining Good Morning Britain, Garraway's appearances on Lorraine have become less frequent. Garraway once again became interim main presenter on ITV Breakfast when Ben Shepherd cut his appearances each week to just two; which meant Garraway hosted four times a week until Piers Morgan joined the show later that year.

From March 2014 until November 2016, Garraway occasionally presented The National Lottery Draws on BBC One. In September 2017, she made a cameo appearance in Hollyoaks.

In November 2019, Garraway came fourth in the nineteenth series of I'm a Celebrity...Get Me Out of Here!

Strictly Come Dancing

Garraway appeared in the fifth series of Strictly Come Dancing, partnered with professional dancer Anton du Beke. Garraway finished 8th of the 14 couples despite receiving the lowest score from the judges in every week but one, as she was repeatedly saved by the public vote, prior to her elimination in week seven.

In February 2008, Garraway launched legal action against the Sunday Mirror after it published a photograph of her embracing du Beke, insinuating that they were having an affair, which the pair both denied.

Radio
Garraway's broadcasting career began with BBC Radio Oxford, and she had become an Independent Television News trainee journalist by 1994.

On 18 and 19 August 2012, Garraway co-presented two episodes of 'Weekend Breakfast' (with Colin Paterson). Over the weekend of 8 September, Garraway again presented 'Weekend Breakfast' with Colin Patterson.
On 6 October 2013, she stood in for Andrew Castle for a show on LBC Radio.

Since March 2014, Garraway has presented Mid Mornings with Kate Garraway 10am–1pm on Smooth Radio.

Personal life
Garraway was married to Ian Rumsey, her former boss at ITV Meridian, from 1998 to 2002.

In September 2005, Garraway married Derek Draper in Camden, London. Draper was a political aide to former Labour cabinet minister Peter Mandelson, and was at the centre of the scandal known as "Lobbygate". They live in north London and have a daughter, Darcey, and a son.

Draper has had an unusually serious case of Long COVID; he was diagnosed with COVID-19 in March 2020 and remained hospitalised in a critical condition as of March 2021. Garraway stated that he "may never recover" and could have "no quality of life" due to the numerous medical complications as a result of COVID-19. Draper returned home on a trial basis in April 2021, and in May 2021, Garraway gave an update on her husband stating that he is "devastated by COVID-19" and "still can't really move". Garraway is a charity ambassador for the  Make-A-Wish Foundation.

She released her first book on 9 March 2017, entitled The Joy of Big Knickers (or learning to love the rest of your life).

She is a supporter of Gillingham FC.

On 29 April 2021, Garraway's latest book entitled The Power of Hope was released.

Garraway was appointed Member of the Order of the British Empire (MBE) in the 2022 New Year Honours for services to broadcasting, journalism and charity.

On the ITV show DNA Journey Garraway found out that she is a relation of Michael Bond, the creator of Paddington Bear.

Filmography

Television

Guest appearances

Have I Got News for You (2003)
The Wright Stuff (2003)
8 Out of 10 Cats (5 August 2005)
Celebrity Stars in Their Eyes (2006)
The F Word (2008)
Alan Carr's Celebrity Ding Dong (2008)
Shooting Stars (2008)
As Seen on TV (2009)
Who Wants to Be a Millionaire? (2007)
Who Wants to Be a Millionaire? (2011)
All Star Family Fortunes (2012)
Pointless Celebrities (2012, 2014, 2015)
Paddy's 2012 Show & Telly (2012)
This Morning (2012; 5 episodes)
Celebrity Juice (2013)
Tricked (2013)
The Chase: Celebrity Special (2013, 2019)
The Guess List (2014)
Celebrity Fifteen to One (2014)
Pointless Celebrities (2015)
James Martin: Home Comforts (2016)
The Keith Lemon Sketch Show (2016)
The TV That Made Me (2016)
Safeword (2016)
Through the Keyhole (2017)
Hollyoaks (2017)
Guess the Star (2017)
Saturday Morning with James Martin (2018)
The Crystal Maze (2018)
Tipping Point: Lucky Stars (2019)
Love Your Garden : Grow Your Own (2022)

Film

Authored works
 The Joy of Big Knickers: Or Learning to Love the Rest of Your Life, Blink Publishing, 2017. 
 The Power of Hope, Bantam Press, 2021.

Awards

References

External links

Kate Garraway on Smooth Radio

1967 births
Living people
Alumni of Bath Spa University
British infotainers
English reporters and correspondents
English television presenters
GMTV presenters and reporters
I'm a Celebrity...Get Me Out of Here! (British TV series) participants
ITV Breakfast presenters and reporters
ITV regional newsreaders and journalists
People from Abingdon-on-Thames
Smooth Network presenters
Members of the Order of the British Empire